Arebasankoppa is a village in Dharwad district of Karnataka, India.

Demographics 
As of the 2011 Census of India there were 122 households in Arebasankoppa and a total population of 632 consisting of 321 males and 311 females. There were 114 children ages 0-6.

References

Villages in Dharwad district